Roy Ernest Hart (30 May 1933 – June 2014) was an English professional footballer who played in the Football League for Brentford as a centre half.

Career statistics

References

1933 births
Footballers from Acton, London
English footballers
Brentford F.C. players
English Football League players
2014 deaths
Association football wing halves